Grover Lewis (November 8, 1934 – April 16, 1995) was an American journalist now regarded as one of the forerunners of new journalism. His lengthy examinations of film, music and more in the 1970s included profiles of Paul Newman, The Allman Brothers Band, and an influential piece written about The Last Picture Show.  He also did freelance work for The Village Voice, Texas Monthly, and was an editor and contributor to Rolling Stone.

Lewis published two books during his lifetime: I'll Be There in the Morning If I Live, a book of poetry, and Academy All the Way, a collection of essays he wrote for Rolling Stone. In 2005, the University of Texas Press released a compendium of his entire career entitled Splendor in the Short Grass, edited by and with an introduction by Jan Reid and W.K. Stratton, and with a foreword by Dave Hickey and a remembrance by Robert Draper.

Books
 I'll Be There in the Morning If I Live (poetry)
 Academy All The Way (collection)
 Splendor in the Short Grass (collection)

Personal life
When he was 8 years old, his parents, Grover Sr. and Opal, "shot each other to death with a pawnshop pistol".

References

External links
New York Times review of "Splendor In The Short Grass"
University of Texas Press Website

1934 births
1995 deaths
American male journalists
20th-century American journalists
Rolling Stone people